Sacred Heart Church or formally the Church of the Sacred Heart of Jesus is a Roman Catholic parish church in Caterham, Surrey, England designed by Ingress Bell and built in 1881. It is situated between Essendene Road and Whyteleafe Road off the High Street. The building is Grade II listed.

Construction
In 1879, after a request from Francis Parson, a local Catholic, the Bishop of Southwark, James Danell, sent Fr Francis Roe to Caterham to serve as priest there. Hs first Mass was on 24 August 1879 in a local depot, where army officers built a temporary chapel. Before this, a priest from Croydon travelled to Caterham to celebrate Mass for soldiers and local Catholics.

On 24 June 1880, the foundation stone of the church was laid by Bishop Danell. Most of the construction was paid for by Fr Roe's father, Captain William Harriott Roe. The architect for the church was Ingress Bell, who also designed St Joseph Church in Guildford (demolished in the 1980s) in 1881. He adopted the Early English Gothic Revival style and a cruciform plan.

On 11 August 1881 the church was opened. The first Mass was celebrated by the Archbishop of Westminster, Cardinal Manning.

Interior
Joseph Aloysius Pippet designed murals; they were painted around the apse, and windows built, by Hardman & Co. The murals, which illustrate the life of Jesus, are not contemporary with the church: it was stated in 1907 that "[t]he sanctuary has been recently adorned with elegant mosaic pictures".

Parish
The parish covers the Catholic population of Caterham, Whyteleafe and Godstone. The church celebrates a Mass every day, and three on Sundays. Services are livestreamed and recorded. The Pippet murals were badly damaged by water ingress and attempts at repair; they were conserved and restored from 2015. The church is a member of the Latin Mass Society of England and Wales.

See also
 List of places of worship in Tandridge (district)

References

Bibliography

External links

 Sacred Heart Church site

Roman Catholic churches in Surrey
Roman Catholic churches completed in 1881
Grade II listed churches in Surrey
Gothic Revival church buildings in England
Grade II listed Roman Catholic churches in England
Gothic Revival architecture in Surrey
1881 establishments in England
19th-century Roman Catholic church buildings in the United Kingdom